Ectoedemia phaeolepis is a moth of the family Nepticulidae. It is endemic to the Iberian Peninsula.

The wingspan is 5.4–6 mm. Adults are on wing from late May to early August.

The larvae feed on Quercus ilex and Quercus rotundifolia. They mine the leaves of their host plant. The mine consists of a narrow sinuous gallery which changes later into a large blotch with two lateral bands of frass.

External links
Fauna Europaea
bladmineerders.nl
Western Palaearctic Ectoedemia (Zimmermannia) Hering and Ectoedemia Busck s. str. (Lepidoptera, Nepticulidae): five new species and new data on distribution, hostplants and recognition

Nepticulidae
Moths of Europe
Moths described in 2009